Jalan Kawasan Perindustrian Hulu Langat, Federal Route 3210, is an industrial federal roads in Selangor, Malaysia. This 17.6-km industrial federal road connects Pekan Batu Sembilan (Bt-9) Cheras in the southwest to Hulu Langat in the east.

The Kilometre Zero is located at Pekan Batu Sembilan (Bt-9) Cheras.

At most sections, the Federal Route 3210 was built under the JKR R5 road standard, allowing maximum speed limit of up to 90 km/h.

There is one overlap:  - Jalan Hulu Langat (from Pekan Batu Sembilan (Bt-9) Cheras town centre to Langat Dam).

List of junctions

References

Malaysian Federal Roads